The W Barcelona Hotel, popularly known as the Hotel Vela (Sail Hotel) due to its shape, is a building designed by Ricardo Bofill located in the Barceloneta district of Barcelona, in the expansion of the Port of Barcelona. The hotel is managed by Marriott International  marketed under the brand W Hotels.

The building, designed by Ricardo Bofill Taller de Arquitectura, stands in 7 hectares of land reclaimed from the sea surface in the construction of the new entrance to the harbour.  It is also known to resemble the Burj Al Arab of Dubai, United Arab Emirates.

The five-star hotel comprises 473 rooms, 67 suites, 400 employees, a bar located on the rooftop, a spa and fitness centre, indoor and outdoor pools, terraces, beaches, restaurants, rooms dance, and other facilities grouped under a platform of terraces. The hotel also provides a restaurant lead by the Michelin-starred chef, Carles Abellán.

Controversy 
The W Barcelona Hotel was built on land owned by the Port Authority of Barcelona, a public entity, but the award method for the project has not been made public. In the Barceloneta neighborhood, there have been voices against the building, arguing that the law states that a building can only be built on land reclaimed from the sea if it is a port facility. Nudists and surfers, groups that can often be seen on the beaches of Barceloneta and Sant Sebastià, argue that the hotel complex alters the sea currents due to the extension of the breakwater, as well as altering wind currents, affecting Catalan catamaran competitions and the practice of windsurfing. Another controversy derives from the fact that it does not comply with the Spanish coastal law, which specifically prohibits building at less than 100 meters from the coast, while the hotel was built at merely 20 meters from the sea.

See also 

 List of tallest buildings and structures in Barcelona
 Burj Al Arab - a similar-shaped building in Dubai, United Arab Emirates
 Elite Plaza - a similar-shaped skyscraper in Yerevan, Armenia
 JW Marriott Panama - similar structure in Panama City, Panama, also managed by Marriott International
 Vasco da Gama Tower - similar structure in Lisbon, Portugal
 Blue Sky Tower - a similar-shaped skyscraper in Ulaanbaatar, Mongolia
 Sail Tower - a similar-shaped skyscraper in Haifa, Israel
 List of works by Ricardo Bofill Taller de Arquitectura

References 

 
Ricardo Bofill buildings
Skyscraper hotels in Barcelona
Barcelona
Hotel buildings completed in 2009
2009 establishments in Spain
High-tech architecture